"Clear!" is a 2009 non-album single from Kardinal Offishall. The song was produced by Supa Dups and Kardinal Offishall himself. Fatman Scoop is featured at the beginning of the song with him yelling "Kardinal!" The song contains a sample of "Think (About It)" by Lyn Collins.

Music video
The music video is based on Kardinal Offishall touring the far east. The beginning takes place in Toronto with him at the airport. In the next scene, he performs in Hong Kong. The following location takes place in Beijing and he arrives at Hotel G the night before he does another performance. The last minute of the video shows Kardinal Offishall in Shanghai and Singapore.

Remix
The remix features Elephant Man.

Chart performance
The single debuted on the Canadian Hot 100 at #65, making it his third entry on the chart. It peaked at #57.

Chart positions

References

External links
"Clear!" music video

2009 singles
Kardinal Offishall songs
2009 songs
Songs written by Kardinal Offishall
Geffen Records singles
Songs written by Supa Dups